Lélia Gonzalez (February 1, 1935 – July 10, 1994) was a Brazilian intellectual, politician, professor, anthropologist and a woman human rights defender.

Biography 
The daughter of a black railroad worker and an indigenous maid, she was the second youngest of eighteen siblings, including footballer Jaime de Almeida, who played for Flamengo. Born in Belo Horizonte, she moved to Rio de Janeiro in 1942.

She graduated with a degree in history and philosophy, then worked as a public school teacher. She did her master's degree in media, and her doctorate in political anthropology. She then began to devote herself to research on the relationship between gender and ethnicity. She taught Brazilian Culture at the Pontifical Catholic University of Rio de Janeiro, where she headed the department of sociology and politics.

As a secondary school teacher at CAp-UERJ (part of Rio de Janeiro State University) during the dictatorship of the sixties, she made her philosophy classes a space of resistance and sociopolitical critique, which influenced the thought and action of her students.

She helped found institutions such as the Black Movement of Brazil, Research Institute of Black Cultures (Instituto de Pesquisas das Culturas Negras, IPCN), the Black Women's Collective, N'Zinga, and the group Olodum. Her activism in defense of black women carried it to the National Council on Women's Rights, where she worked from 1985 to 1989. She was a federal legislative candidate for the Workers' Party, being chosen as the first alternate. In the next election, in 1986, she ran for state representative for the Democratic Labour Party, being chosen again as a substitute.

Her writings, simultaneously permeated by the scenarios of political dictatorship and the emergence of social movements, reveal her interdisciplinary commitment and portray a constant concern in articulating the broader struggles of Brazilian society with the specific demand of blacks and especially of black women

In 1982, together with Carlos Hasenbalg, she published Lugar de Negro and in 1987, she published the book Festas populares no Brasil.

Legacy 
Among other tributes, Lélia Gonzalez is the namesake of a state public school in the neighborhood of Ramos in Rio de Janeiro, a reference center of black culture in Goiânia, and a cultural cooperative in Aracaju. She was quoted by the African bloc Ilê Aiyê in two editions of the Carnival of Bahia: in 1997, as part of the story "Black Pearls of Knowledge", and in 1998 with "Candace".

In 2003, the playwright Márcio Meirelles wrote and directed the play Candaces - A reconstrução do fogo ("Candaces: A Reconstruction of Fire"), based on her work.

In 2010, the government of the state of Bahia created the Lélia Gonzalez Award to encourage public policies towards women in Bahia municipalities.

On February 1, 2020, Google celebrated her 85th birthday with a Google Doodle.

Articles 

 “Mulher negra, essa quilombola.” Folha de S.Paulo, Folhetim. Domingo 22 de novembro de 1981.
 “A mulher negra na sociedade brasileira.” In: LUZ, Madel, T., org. O lugar da mulher; estudos sobre a condição feminina na sociedade atual. Rio de Janeiro, Graal, 1982. 146p. p. 87-106. (Coleção Tendências, 1.).
 “Racismo e sexismo na cultura brasileira.” In: SILVA, Luiz Antônio Machado et alii. Movimentos sociais urbanos, minorias étnicas e outros estudos. Brasília, ANPOCS, 1983. 303p. p. 223-44. (Ciências Sociais Hoje, 2.).
 “O terror nosso de cada dia.” Raça e Classe. (2): 8, ago./set. 1987.
 “A categoria político-cultural de amefricanidade.” Tempo Brasileiro, Rio de Janeiro (92/93): 69-82, jan./jun. 1988.
 “As amefricanas do Brasil e sua militância.” Maioria Falante. (7): 5, maio/jun. 1988.
 “Nanny.” Humanidades, Brasília (17): 23-5, 1988.
 “Por um feminismo afrolatinoamericano.” Revista Isis Internacional. (8), out. 1988.
 “A importância da organização da mulher negra no processo de transformação social.” Raça e Classe. (5): 2, nov./dez. 1988.
 “Uma viagem à Martinica - I.” MNU Jornal. (20): 5, out./nov.

References

External links

Further reading 

 Brum, Camila (2020). Amefricanizando O Feminismo: O Pensamento De Lélia Gonzalez. Spotify Podcast
 Davis, Angela (2019): (in English, min. 51:37-53:25). 
 Decoloniality Reading Circle: A short introduction to the life and work of Lélia Gonzalez (1935-1994)
Gonzalez, Lélia (2018). Lélia Gonzalez: primavera para as rosas negras. São Paulo: UCPA Editora. 
 Gonzalez, Lélia (1986). Entrevista. O Pasquim, 871, p. 8-10, Entrevista concedida a Jaguar. 
 Gonzalez, Lélia (1983). “Racismo e sexismo na cultura brasileira”. In Silva, L. A. (Ed.), Movimentos sociais urbanos, minorias e outros estudos. [Ciências Sociais Hoje, ANPOCS, 2], 223-244. 
 Gonzalez, L. (1988). For an Afro-Latin American Feminism. In Confronting the crisis in Latin America: Women organizing for change (pp. 95-101). Santiago: Isis International & Development Alternatives with Women for a New Era (Dawn). 
 Hollanda, Heloísa Buarque (Ed.) (1980). Patrulhas ideológicas. São Paulo: Brasiliense. Perry, K.-K. Y. and Sotero, E. (2020). Amefricanidade: The Black Diaspora Feminism of Lélia Gonzalez. In Lasa2020 Forum (Améfrica Ladina: Vinculando Mundos y Saberes, Tejiendo Esperanzas), 50(3), 60-64.

1935 births
1994 deaths
Brazilian politicians of indigenous peoples descent
Brazilian politicians of African descent
People from Belo Horizonte
Brazilian feminists
Brazilian anthropologists
Brazilian women anthropologists
Workers' Party (Brazil) politicians
Democratic Labour Party (Brazil) politicians
Academic staff of the Pontifical Catholic University of Rio de Janeiro
20th-century anthropologists